Wilshire/Rodeo is a planned heavy-rail subway station in the Los Angeles County Metro Rail system. It is currently under construction as part of the D Line Extension project, in Beverly Hills, California. Construction started in 2018 as part of phase 2 of the extension project. It is slated to open in early 2025.

The station is being built at the site of the former Ace Gallery on the Southwest corner of Wilshire Boulevard and Reeves Drive in Beverly Hills.

History
Construction of Wilshire/Rodeo station was officially kicked off on September 23, 2019.

On March 31, 2020, the Beverly Hills City Council approved a proposal from the Los Angeles County Metropolitan Transportation Authority to fully close the two blocks of Wilshire Boulevard needed to facilitate the station's construction, taking advantage of lower traffic levels resulting from the COVID-19 pandemic in California. This would allow for expedited construction of the station and better mitigation of construction impacts as opposed to the original plan, which would require alternating weekend closures for 13 weeks over a 3.5-month period, with completion scheduled for March 2021. Fully closing Wilshire Boulevard, which went into effect the next day and lasted until June 2020, expedited construction of the station by as much as six months.

Metro officially completed foundation and decking work for Wilshire/Rodeo station seven months ahead of schedule on June 14, 2020, with Tutor Perini, the project's general contractor, putting workers on extra shifts to further expedite construction. Wilshire Boulevard reopened in both directions later that evening, with construction and excavation activities continuing underground until that phase's scheduled completion in the first quarter of 2021.

Station layout
Wilshire/Rodeo station was originally planned with a single entrance, located at the southwest corner of Wilshire Boulevard and Reeves Drive. However, as part of an agreement Metro negotiated with the City of Beverly Hills which was approved on February 28, 2019, a second entrance is being planned on the northern side of Wilshire Boulevard, with three locations being considered.

The station will be the only station in the Metro Rail system (aside from Union Station) to have public toilets, which will likely be built after the station opens, and may be built above-ground and/or integrated into a new development which would be built above the station.

Attractions
The station is located in the Platinum Triangle neighborhood that includes the Rodeo Drive shopping district and its many hotels, including the Luxe Rodeo Drive Hotel, the Beverly Wilshire Hotel, the Beverly Hilton, and The Peninsula Beverly Hills. It also lies a few blocks south of the Beverly Gardens Park and its Electric Fountain, and Beverly Cañon Gardens Park.  It is also located directly next to Reeves Park.

Various fine dining establishments are located in the neighborhood, including Spago, which is directly across the street.

The Academy Headquarters Building along with its Samuel Goldwyn Theater, the Paley Center for Media and the Wallis Annenberg Center for the Performing Arts are located nearby. The Rodeo Drive Walk of Style aligns Rodeo Drive.

References

External links
Transit Agency Information

Future Los Angeles Metro Rail stations
Railway stations scheduled to open in 2025
D Line (Los Angeles Metro)
Wilshire, Los Angeles
Wilshire Boulevard